Britishvolt is a UK startup manufacturer of lithium-ion batteries. The company initially planned production of batteries for the automotive industry. It began construction of a gigafactory in northeast England in 2021, but work was halted in August 2022 due to funding difficulties. The company went into administration on 17 January 2023. In February 2023, it was bought out of administration by an Australian startup, Recharge Industries, which said it planned to resume construction in late 2023 and initially focus on batteries for energy storage before - with technology partner C4V - manufacturing products for sports cars.

History
Britishvolt was incorporated as Power by Britishvolt Ltd in December 2019. Its cofounders included Swedish former investment banker Orral Nadjari and Swedish automotive entrepreneur Lars Carlstrom. Carlstrom quit as Britishvolt's chairman in December 2020 after details of a tax fraud conviction in Sweden were revealed. US billionaire William Harrison was a shareholder through Cathexis Holdings; Harrison also owns the contractor ISG, which was leading construction of Britishvolt's factory.

Britishvolt rented a serviced office in London's Mayfair district and Newfield House, a mansion east of the Northumberland town of Blyth, used as office space. The company also had a team in Canada led by former Quebec premier Philippe Couillard.

It later emerged that management consultancy EY was heavily involved in Britishvolt's formation, with the startup sometimes spending more money paying consultants, including EY, than it did its own staff. Insiders said EY had been instrumental in helping Britishvolt become a functioning enterprise ("They wrote the whole business plan from scratch, they did everything"), and three senior Britishvolt staff, including its chief financial officer, were all hired from EY in 2021.

Factory construction
Initially the company was reported to be planning a battery factory near Bridgend in South Wales or near Coventry, but, in December 2020, Blyth was confirmed as the location for the Britishvolt manufacturing plant. In July 2021 plans for a £2.6bn gigafactory employing 3,000 people were approved, with the new Britishvolt plant to be located on former coalyards adjacent to the former power station in Cambois, near Blyth. Britishvolt appointed ISG as its construction partner; ISG began work on clearing the site and creating foundations for the factory, taking its first delivery of aggregate from a Cumbria quarry in July 2021 and starting construction on 6 September 2021. West Yorkshire-based engineering and services business NG Bailey was also engaged on the Blyth project and on a related development at Hams Hall in the West Midlands.

Anglo-Swiss mining giant Glencore invested in Britishvolt in August 2021, and was part of a £50M funding round with NG Bailey and Norway's Carbon Transition ASA. In late 2021 Britishvolt was reported to be considering a stock market listing in either London or New York to help raise the £2 billion needed for the factory's construction. In January 2022 the UK government, through its Automotive Transformation Fund, committed to investing £100M in the Britishvolt project, alongside asset management company Abrdn and its property investment arm Tritax, supporting development of what was planned to be Britain's fourth-largest building. Glencore invested a further £40M in February 2022, topping up its previous funding of Britishvolt that then valued the company at more than $1 billion (£740M). In June 2022, Britishvolt announced an investment by Sunbelt Rentals, the main operating subsidiary of the Ashtead Group.

In July 2022, the Department for Business, Energy and Industrial Strategy confirmed the UK government grant. A supplier park, power connections and extensive road and rail transport infrastructure are needed to support the factory, with tranches of funding to be provided as the project develops. Further fundraising efforts were being led by US-based Bank of America and Citibank, with London investment bank Peel Hunt and Lazard as financial adviser.

Suspension of construction
ISG suspended construction work at Blyth and largest shareholder Nadjari quit as CEO in August 2022 amid funding concerns; The Guardian said the project had been put on "life support" to cut spending while it looked to conclude its next round of funding. The company said: "We are ahead in our enabling works at the gigasite in Northumberland ... this has allowed us to now take the time to focus on the design work for the site and to reschedule some construction work so that we can optimise the build process for each of the project's four phases, to better source materials given current supply constraints because of the global economic situation, and to enhance our cost efficiencies." Manufacturing was then expected to start in mid-2025, some 18 months later than initially planned.

Financial issues 
In September 2022, a further Guardian report said Britishvolt, facing problems that were making fundraising difficult, had called in consultancy EY to help. Sources were said to be concerned about the startup's management and talked of increasingly urgent attempts to secure financial support. The Financial Times noted the business was spending £3M a month on salaries after hiring almost 300 people while still years from generating revenue; "profligate spending" included provision of expensive electric company cars, a hospitality suite at the Goodwood Festival of Speed motorsport event, "prolific" private jet use, video yoga lessons from a fitness instructor, and top-of-the-range curved 4K computer monitors. Published accounts covering the 14 months to January 2021 showed a loss of £8.8M, warning of "material uncertainties that may cast significant doubt on the company’s ability to continue as a going concern", and government supporters rated Britishvolt's chances of survival at 50-50.

On 2 November 2022, the UK government refused to advance £30M of its grant funding to Britishvolt (release of funds was contingent on reaching construction milestones), putting the company at risk of going into administration. As the company urgently sought a new buyer or major investor, Glencore reportedly provided less than £5M, sufficient to keep the company going for just five weeks. The executive team was also set to work unpaid while other staff agreed voluntary pay cuts, receiving 25% or 50% of their salaries in November. Britishvolt said it was "continuing to pursue positive ongoing discussions with potential investors". The company was said to need a buyer within five weeks. Two weeks later, receivers were appointed for a Britishvolt subsidiary, and by the end of November 2022, the company was reported to have abandoned its ambitions to build a second factory in Canada; Philippe Couillard had ceased working for Britishvolt in October 2022.

In January 2023, the company was the target of two rival rescue bids. On 10 January, the Guardian reported Britishvolt was in talks with an Indonesia-linked investor consortium about a £160M rescue deal to avoid administration. The consortium (led by a UK-based private equity investor, DeaLab Group, and an associated metals business, Barracuda Group), would pay £30M for 95% of the business - a far cry from its previous $1bn (£820M) valuation - leaving current shareholders (including Nadjari, Glencore and Ashtead) with 5% of the business worth under £2M. The consortium would then invest £128M to fund the next stage in Britishvolt's development. The FT then reported that three shareholders had tabled a matching bid that valued the company marginally higher. The takeover bids were to be discussed by Britishvolt's board on 13 January.

Administration
Ahead of a Britishvolt staff meeting on 16 January 2023, the BBC reported that "a British consortium" might make a last minute bid, adding, if no bidder secured 75% of shareholder support, the company might be heading for administration. It reported UK government views that it might be preferable for the company to collapse into administration so that more serious players might take the project on. The following day, 17 January 2023, Britishvolt went into administration, with most of its 300 staff immediately made redundant. The company's board was believed to have decided there were no viable bids to keep the company afloat, and appointed EY as administrators (an unsecured creditor, EY had previously earned millions of pounds in consultancy fees from Britishvolt, and was criticised for its dual roles in the administration process, earning around £3.5M in fees as administrator). The company reportedly owed up to £120M to creditors when it collapsed, a figure later revised upwards to £160M. As a shareholder, the Ashtead plant hire firm later revealed it took a £35M hit from Britishvolt's collapse; NG Bailey lost over £2M.

Following the administration announcement, several companies, including Glencore and Jaguar Land Rover owner Tata Motors, expressed interest in buying Britishvolt's Blyth factory site - regarded, with its deepwater port and access to clean energy and rail links, as ideal for a large-scale battery factory. Any preferred bidder for the site must plan to build a battery manufacturing plant and have at least £150M of working capital in order to receive the government's pledged £100M grant for the project.

On 24 January 2023, a non-binding offer for Britishvolt was made by Geelong, Australia-based startup Recharge Industries (a subsidiary of Scale Facilitation Partners LLC), which had earlier partnered with North America's lithium-ion battery technology company C4V, the founding company of the USA's first gigafactory, and which was also planning a Geelong gigafactory to be designed by US engineering firm, Jacobs. EY administrators, originally expected to sell the business for under £10M by the end of January 2023, were also in talks with a potential private equity investor Greybull Capital. On 4 February 2023, EY was reported to be working with Recharge Industries as its preferred bidder, ahead of bids from Greybull, a group of current shareholders, and Saudi British Bank.

Takeover by Recharge Industries
On 26 February 2023, Recharge Industries announced it had bought Britishvolt out of administration; the company was sold for £8.6M. Instead of automotive batteries, Scale Facilitation CEO David Collard said Britishvolt planned to initially focus on batteries for energy storage, making these available by the end of 2025, with batteries for high-performance sports cars to follow later. One of Recharge's strengths was its existing relationship with American lithium-ion battery developer C4V, removing the need to develop new technology, and its access to Australian minerals including lithium. Collard said factory construction at Blyth would resume in six to 12 months, but the site would ultimately create up to 8,000 jobs on site and in the supply chain. The FT reported that the takeover related to Britishvolt's battery technology and that it had until the end of March 2023 to close a rumoured £10M deal to buy the Blyth site and pay a creditor whose debt is secured against the land. On 17 March 2023, Northumberland County Council extended a buy-back clause on the Blyth site, giving Britishvolt's new owners more time to build the gigafactory.

Product and market development
Sports car maker Lotus is among four automotive manufacturers that have signed memorandums of understanding to be supplied by Britishvolt. In March 2022 Aston Martin also committed to working with Britishvolt to develop energy cells, and Britishvolt CEO Nadjari also intended to target Elon Musk's Tesla.

In June 2022, Britishvolt signed a deal with South Korea-based POSCO Chemical to secure the supply of cathode and anode materials for its supply chain.

In September 2022, Britishvolt batteries passed safety tests, allowing development cells to be shipped to seven customers for further testing.

References

External links
Company website

2019 establishments in England
Companies based in Northumberland
Blyth, Northumberland
Lithium-ion batteries
Companies that have entered administration in the United Kingdom